The 2008–09 Detroit Pistons season was the 68th season of the franchise, the 61st in the National Basketball Association (NBA), and the 52nd in the Detroit area. The season was the first under new head coach Michael Curry, who took over for Flip Saunders who was fired at the conclusion of the 2007–08 season.

In the playoffs, the Pistons were swept by the Cleveland Cavaliers in four games in the First Round.

During the season, the Pistons traded Chauncey Billups, Antonio McDyess, and Cheikh Samb to the Denver Nuggets in exchange for Allen Iverson. McDyess was waived by the Nuggets and was re-signed by the Pistons. It was their first losing season since the 2000–01 NBA season, and the first time they didn't reach the Eastern Conference Finals since the 2001-02 NBA season. The 2008–09 season was also the last time the Pistons qualified for the playoffs, until the 2015–16 season where they were also swept by the Cavaliers and again in the first round. Following the season, Rasheed Wallace signed as a free agent with the Boston Celtics, and Iverson left to sign with the Memphis Grizzlies and Curry was fired.

Draft picks

On the day of the draft, the Pistons traded D. J. White to the Seattle SuperSonics in exchange for the rights to Seattle's number 32 and number 46 picks. The picks were used to select Walter Sharpe from Alabama–Birmingham and Trent Plaisted from Brigham Young, respectively.

Roster

Regular season

Standings

Game log

|- bgcolor="#bbffbb"
| 1
| October 29
| Indiana
| 
| Tayshaun Prince (19)
| Rasheed Wallace (7)
| Chauncey Billups (7)
| The Palace of Auburn Hills22,076
| 1–0

|- bgcolor="#bbffbb"
| 2
| November 1
| Washington
| 
| Richard Hamilton (24)
| Rasheed Wallace (12)
| Chauncey Billups (8)
| The Palace of Auburn Hills22,076
| 2–0
|- bgcolor="#bbffbb"
| 3
| November 3
| @ Charlotte
| 
| Richard Hamilton (19)
| Kwame Brown (9)
| Richard Hamilton (5)
| Time Warner Cable Arena11,023
| 3–0
|- bgcolor="#bbffbb"
| 4
| November 5
| @ Toronto
| 
| Tayshaun Prince (27)
| Rasheed Wallace (12)
| Richard Hamilton, Rodney Stuckey (5)
| Air Canada Centre18,602
| 4–0
|- bgcolor="#ffcccc"
| 5
| November 7
| @ New Jersey
| 
| Allen Iverson (24)
| Tayshaun Prince (11)
| Allen Iverson, Rodney Stuckey (6)
| Izod Center17,767
| 4–1
|- bgcolor="#ffcccc"
| 6
| November 9
| Boston
| 
| Tayshaun Prince (23)
| Rasheed Wallace (11)
| Allen Iverson (4)
| The Palace of Auburn Hills22,076
| 4–2
|- bgcolor="#bbffbb"
| 7
| November 11
| @ Sacramento
| 
| Allen Iverson (30)
| Tayshaun Prince (11)
| Allen Iverson (9)
| ARCO Arena11,423
| 5–2
|- bgcolor="#bbffbb"
| 8
| November 13
| @ Golden State
| 
| Richard Hamilton (24)
| Tayshaun Prince (16)
| Allen Iverson (9)
| Oracle Arena18,477
| 6–2
|- bgcolor="#bbffbb"
| 9
| November 14
| @ L.A. Lakers
| 
| Allen Iverson, Rasheed Wallace (25)
| Rasheed Wallace (13)
| Tayshaun Prince (6)
| Staples Center18,997
| 7–2
|- bgcolor="#ffcccc"
| 10
| November 16
| @ Phoenix
| 
| Richard Hamilton (19)
| Rasheed Wallace (9)
| Allen Iverson (7)
| US Airways Center18,422
| 7–3
|- bgcolor="#bbffbb"
| 11
| November 19
| Cleveland
| 
| Allen Iverson (23)
| Rasheed Wallace (15)
| Richard Hamilton (5)
| The Palace of Auburn Hills22,076
| 8–3
|- bgcolor="#ffcccc"
| 12
| November 20
| @ Boston
| 
| Allen Iverson (16)
| Kwame Brown, Tayshaun Prince (7)
| Allen Iverson (4)
| TD Banknorth Garden18,624
| 8–4
|- bgcolor="#ffcccc"
| 13
| November 23
| Minnesota
| 
| Tayshaun Prince (20)
| Rasheed Wallace (10)
| Will Bynum, Richard Hamilton (6)
| The Palace of Auburn Hills22,076
| 8–5
|- bgcolor="#bbffbb"
| 14
| November 26
| New York
| 
| Richard Hamilton (17)
| Amir Johnson (13)
| Rodney Stuckey (11)
| The Palace of Auburn Hills22,076
| 9–5
|- bgcolor="#bbffbb"
| 15
| November 28
| Milwaukee
| 
| Allen Iverson (17)
| Jason Maxiell (8)
| Allen Iverson (7)
| The Palace of Auburn Hills22,076
| 10–5
|- bgcolor="#ffcccc"
| 16
| November 30
| Portland
| 
| Richard Hamilton (18)
| Amir Johnson (8)
| Rodney Stuckey (5)
| The Palace of Auburn Hills22,076
| 10–6

|- bgcolor="#bbffbb"
| 17
| December 2
| @ San Antonio
| 
| Allen Iverson, Rasheed Wallace (19)
| Tayshaun Prince (12)
| Rodney Stuckey (7)
| AT&T Center17,582
| 11–6
|- bgcolor="#ffcccc"
| 18
| December 5
| Philadelphia
| 
| Richard Hamilton (19)
| Rasheed Wallace, Kwame Brown (8)
| Allen Iverson (7)
| The Palace of Auburn Hills22,076
| 11–7
|- bgcolor="#ffcccc"
| 19
| December 7
| @ New York
| 
| Tayshaun Prince (23)
| Tayshaun Prince (10)
| Allen Iverson (7)
| Madison Square Garden19,763
| 11–8
|- bgcolor="#ffcccc"
| 20
| December 9
| @ Washington
| 
| Richard Hamilton (29)
| Tayshaun Prince (11)
| Rodney Stuckey (11)
| Verizon Center14,707
| 11–9
|- bgcolor="#bbffbb"
| 21
| December 12
| Indiana
| 
| Richard Hamilton (28)
| Rasheed Wallace (6)
| Allen Iverson (12)
| The Palace of Auburn Hills22,076
| 12–9
|- bgcolor="#bbffbb"
| 22
| December 13
| @ Charlotte
| 
| Allen Iverson (20)
| Tayshaun Prince, Antonio McDyess (6)
| Rodney Stuckey (10)
| Time Warner Cable Arena17,373
| 13–9
|- bgcolor="#bbffbb"
| 23
| December 17
| Washington
| 
| Allen Iverson (28)
| Tayshaun Prince (10)
| Rodney Stuckey (11)
| The Palace of Auburn Hills22,076
| 14–9
|- bgcolor="#ffcccc"
| 24
| December 19
| Utah
| 
| Allen Iverson (38)
| Rasheed Wallace (8)
| Allen Iverson (7)
| The Palace of Auburn Hills22,076
| 14–10
|- bgcolor="#ffcccc"
| 25
| December 21
| @ Atlanta
| 
| Rasheed Wallace, Rodney Stuckey (20)
| Rodney Stuckey (9)
| Allen Iverson (6)
| Philips Arena15,233
| 14–11
|- bgcolor="#bbffbb"
| 26
| December 23
| Chicago
| 
| Rodney Stuckey (40)
| Tayshaun Prince, Antonio McDyess (11)
| Allen Iverson (8)
| The Palace of Auburn Hills22,076
| 15–11
|- bgcolor="#bbffbb"
| 27
| December 26
| Oklahoma City
| 
| Allen Iverson (22)
| Tayshaun Prince (11)
| Rodney Stuckey, Richard Hamilton (4)
| The Palace of Auburn Hills22,076
| 16–11
|- bgcolor="#bbffbb"
| 28
| December 27
| @ Milwaukee
| 
| Tayshaun Prince (19)
| Rasheed Wallace (12)
| Rodney Stuckey, Allen Iverson (6)
| Bradley Center17,086
| 17–11
|- bgcolor="#bbffbb"
| 29
| December 29
| Orlando
| 
| Rodney Stuckey (19)
| Antonio McDyess (8)
| Antonio McDyess (5)
| The Palace of Auburn Hills22,076
| 18–11
|- bgcolor="#bbffbb"
| 30
| December 31
| New Jersey
| 
| Allen Iverson (19)
| Jason Maxiell (9)
| Tayshaun Prince (5)
| The Palace of Auburn Hills22,076
| 19–11

|- bgcolor="#bbffbb"
| 31
| January 2
| Sacramento
| 
| Rodney Stuckey (38)
| Amir Johnson (14)
| Rodney Stuckey (7)
| The Palace of Auburn Hills22,076
| 20–11
|- bgcolor="#bbffbb"
| 32
| January 4
| @ L.A. Clippers
| 
| Rodney Stuckey (24)
| Antonio McDyess (15)
| Allen Iverson (10)
| Staples Center17,968
| 21–11
|- bgcolor="#ffcccc"
| 33
| January 7
| @ Portland
| 
| Tayshaun Prince (26)
| Antonio McDyess (13)
| Allen Iverson, Rodney Stuckey (7)
| Rose Garden20,644
| 21–12
|- bgcolor="#bbffbb"
| 34
| January 9
| @ Denver
| 
| Allen Iverson (23)
| Antonio McDyess (12)
| Tayshaun Prince (4)
| Pepsi Center19,682
| 22–12
|- bgcolor="#ffcccc"
| 35
| January 10
| @ Utah
| 
| Rodney Stuckey (19)
| Antonio McDyess (9)
| Allen Iverson (5)
| EnergySolutions Arena19,911
| 22–13
|- bgcolor="#ffcccc"
| 36
| January 13
| Charlotte
| 
| Rodney Stuckey (22)
| Tayshaun Prince, Antonio McDyess (9)
| Rodney Stuckey, Allen Iverson, Tayshaun Prince (5)
| The Palace of Auburn Hills22,076
| 22–14
|- bgcolor="#ffcccc"
| 37
| January 14
| @ Indiana
| 
| Rodney Stuckey (30)
| Rasheed Wallace (15)
| Allen Iverson (7)
| Conseco Fieldhouse11,964
| 22–15
|- bgcolor="#ffcccc"
| 38
| January 16
| @ Oklahoma City
| 
| Tayshaun Prince, Richard Hamilton (18)
| Rasheed Wallace (8)
| Richard Hamilton (5)
| Ford Center19,136
| 22–16
|- bgcolor="#ffcccc"
| 39
| January 17
| New Orleans
| 
| Richard Hamilton (19)
| Antonio McDyess (12)
| Rodney Stuckey (6)
| The Palace of Auburn Hills22,076
| 22–17
|- bgcolor="#bbffbb"
| 40
| January 19
| @ Memphis
| 
| Allen Iverson (27)
| Antonio McDyess (16)
| Richard Hamilton (6)
| FedExForum17,483
| 23–17
|- bgcolor="#bbffbb"
| 41
| January 21
| Toronto
| 
| Tayshaun Prince (25)
| Jason Maxiell (11)
| Rodney Stuckey (7)
| The Palace of Auburn Hills22,076
| 24–17
|- bgcolor="#ffcccc"
| 42
| January 23
| Dallas
| 
| Richard Hamilton (17)
| Rasheed Wallace (9)
| Will Bynum (4)
| The Palace of Auburn Hills22,076
| 24–18
|- bgcolor="#ffcccc"
| 43
| January 25
| Houston
| 
| Richard Hamilton (27)
| Rasheed Wallace (11)
| Rodney Stuckey, Allen Iverson (8)
| The Palace of Auburn Hills22,076
| 24–19
|- bgcolor="#bbffbb"
| 44
| January 28
| @ Minnesota
| 
| Rasheed Wallace (25)
| Rasheed Wallace, Antonio McDyess (10)
| Rodney Stuckey (6)
| Target Center14,232
| 25–19
|- bgcolor="#ffcccc"
| 45
| January 30
| Boston
| 
| Allen Iverson, Rodney Stuckey (19)
| Antonio McDyess (14)
| Richard Hamilton (5)
| The Palace of Auburn Hills22,076
| 25–20

|- bgcolor="#ffcccc"
| 46
| February 1
| Cleveland
| 
| Allen Iverson (22)
| Amir Johnson (9)
| Rodney Stuckey (8)
| The Palace of Auburn Hills22,076
| 25–21
|- bgcolor="#bbffbb"
| 47
| February 4
| Miami
| 
| Rasheed Wallace, Rodney Stuckey (18)
| Antonio McDyess (17)
| Richard Hamilton (7)
| The Palace of Auburn Hills21,720
| 26–21
|- bgcolor="#bbffbb"
| 48
| February 7
| @ Milwaukee
| 
| Richard Hamilton (38)
| Tayshaun Prince (13)
| Allen Iverson, Tayshaun Prince (9)
| Bradley Center17,297
| 27–21
|- bgcolor="#ffcccc"
| 49
| February 8
| Phoenix
| 
| Richard Hamilton (27)
| Antonio McDyess (13)
| Allen Iverson (7)
| The Palace of Auburn Hills22,076
| 27–22
|- bgcolor="#ffcccc"
| 50
| February 10
| @ Chicago
| 
| Richard Hamilton (30)
| Rasheed Wallace (10)
| Richard Hamilton (8)
| United Center21,896
| 27–23
|- bgcolor="#ffcccc"
| 51
| February 11
| Atlanta
| 
| Allen Iverson (28)
| Antonio McDyess (10)
| Tayshaun Prince (8)
| The Palace of Auburn Hills20,124
| 27–24
|- bgcolor="#ffcccc"
| 52
| February 17
| Milwaukee
| 
| Antonio McDyess (24)
| Antonio McDyess (14)
| Allen Iverson, Tayshaun Prince (8)
| The Palace of Auburn Hills20,217
| 27–25
|- bgcolor="#ffcccc"
| 53
| February 19
| San Antonio
| 
| Allen Iverson (31)
| Antonio McDyess (13)
| Rodney Stuckey (8)
| The Palace of Auburn Hills22,076
| 27–26
|- bgcolor="#ffcccc"
| 54
| February 22
| @ Cleveland
| 
| Allen Iverson (14)
| Jason Maxiell (9)
| Richard Hamilton (6)
| Quicken Loans Arena20,562
| 27–27
|- bgcolor="#ffcccc"
| 55
| February 24
| @ Miami
| 
| Allen Iverson (22)
| Tayshaun Prince (9)
| Tayshaun Prince (8)
| American Airlines Arena19,600
| 27–28
|- bgcolor="#ffcccc"
| 56
| February 25
| @ New Orleans
| 
| Richard Hamilton (24)
| Antonio McDyess, Jason Maxiell (9)
| Richard Hamilton, Will Bynum (6)
| New Orleans Arena17,215
| 27–29
|- bgcolor="#bbffbb"
| 57
| February 27
| @ Orlando
| 
| Richard Hamilton (31)
| Antonio McDyess (13)
| Richard Hamilton (6)
| Amway Arena17,461
| 28–29

|- bgcolor="#bbffbb"
| 58
| March 1
| @ Boston
| 
| Richard Hamilton (25)
| Tayshaun Prince (8)
| Richard Hamilton (9)
| TD Banknorth Garden18,624
| 29–29
|- bgcolor="#bbffbb"
| 59
| March 3
| Denver
| 
| Tayshaun Prince (23)
| Antonio McDyess (12)
| Richard Hamilton (7)
| The Palace of Auburn Hills22,076
| 30–29
|- bgcolor="#bbffbb"
| 60
| March 6
| Golden State
| 
| Richard Hamilton (22)
| Jason Maxiell (9)
| Rodney Stuckey (8)
| The Palace of Auburn Hills22,076
| 31–29
|- bgcolor="#ffcccc"
| 61
| March 7
| @ Atlanta
| 
| Richard Hamilton (20)
| Antonio McDyess (12)
| Rodney Stuckey (6)
| Philips Arena19,101
| 31–30
|- bgcolor="#bbffbb"
| 62
| March 9
| Orlando
| 
| Richard Hamilton (29)
| Antonio McDyess (18)
| Richard Hamilton (14)
| The Palace of Auburn Hills20,039
| 32–30
|- bgcolor="#ffcccc"
| 63
| March 11
| New York
| 
| Richard Hamilton (27)
| Antonio McDyess (22)
| Rodney Stuckey (8)
| The Palace of Auburn Hills20,135
| 32–31
|- bgcolor="#bbffbb"
| 64
| March 13
| @ Toronto
| 
| Richard Hamilton (24)
| Antonio McDyess (13)
| Richard Hamilton (16)
| Air Canada Centre19,800
| 33–31
|- bgcolor="#ffcccc"
| 65
| March 15
| Memphis
| 
| Antonio McDyess (19)
| Kwame Brown (13)
| Richard Hamilton (12)
| The Palace of Auburn Hills22,076
| 33–32
|- bgcolor="#ffcccc"
| 66
| March 17
| @ Dallas
| 
| Tayshaun Prince (28)
| Antonio McDyess, Jason Maxiell (9)
| Rodney Stuckey (7)
| American Airlines Center20,427
| 33–33
|- bgcolor="#ffcccc"
| 67
| March 18
| @ Houston
| 
| Arron Afflalo (24)
| Antonio McDyess (20)
| Rodney Stuckey (10)
| Toyota Center18,275
| 33–34
|- bgcolor="#bbffbb"
| 68
| March 20
| L.A. Clippers
| 
| Antonio McDyess (24)
| Antonio McDyess (17)
| Tayshaun Prince (12)
| The Palace of Auburn Hills22,076
| 34–34
|- bgcolor="#ffcccc"
| 69
| March 22
| Miami
| 
| Rodney Stuckey (24)
| Antonio McDyess (12)
| Tayshaun Prince (5)
| The Palace of Auburn Hills22,076
| 34–35
|- bgcolor="#ffcccc"
| 70
| March 24
| @ Chicago
| 
| Will Bynum, Tayshaun Prince (20)
| Kwame Brown (11)
| Will Bynum (9)
| United Center20,502
| 34–36
|- bgcolor="#ffcccc"
| 71
| March 26
| L.A. Lakers
| 
| Will Bynum (25)
| Antonio McDyess (12)
| Will Bynum (11)
| The Palace of Auburn Hills22,076
| 34–37
|- bgcolor="#bbffbb"
| 72
| March 28
| @ Washington
| 
| Richard Hamilton (31)
| Antonio McDyess, Kwame Brown (11)
| Rodney Stuckey (6)
| Verizon Center20,173
| 35–37
|- bgcolor="#bbffbb"
| 73
| March 29
| Philadelphia
| 
| Tayshaun Prince (21)
| Antonio McDyess (6)
| Richard Hamilton (7)
| The Palace of Auburn Hills22,076
| 36–37
|- bgcolor="#ffcccc"
| 74
| March 31
| @ Cleveland
| 
| Richard Hamilton (13)
| Antonio McDyess (10)
| Will Bynum (3)
| Quicken Loans Arena20,562
| 36–38

|- bgcolor="#ffcccc"
| 75
| April 1
| @ New Jersey
| 
| Richard Hamilton (29)
| Rodney Stuckey, Antonio McDyess (7)
| Rodney Stuckey, Richard Hamilton (6)
| Izod Center15,105
| 36–39
|- bgcolor="#ffcccc"
| 76
| April 4
| @ Philadelphia
| 
| Rodney Stuckey (23)
| Kwame Brown (7)
| Rodney Stuckey, Richard Hamilton (4)
| Wachovia Center19,832
| 36–40
|- bgcolor="#bbffbb"
| 77
| April 5
| Charlotte
| 
| Will Bynum (32)
| Antonio McDyess, Kwame Brown (9)
| Will Bynum (7)
| The Palace of Auburn Hills22,076
| 37–40
|- bgcolor="#bbffbb"
| 78
| April 8
| @ New York
| 
| Richard Hamilton (22)
| Antonio McDyess (16)
| Richard Hamilton, Rodney Stuckey (7)
| Madison Square Garden19,763
| 38–40
|- bgcolor="#bbffbb"
| 79
| April 10
| New Jersey
| 
| Will Bynum (20)
| Kwame Brown (7)
| Richard Hamilton (9)
| The Palace of Auburn Hills22,076
| 39–40
|- bgcolor="#ffcccc"
| 80
| April 11
| @ Indiana
| 
| Richard Hamilton (23)
| Antonio McDyess (15)
| Will Bynum (6)
| Conseco Fieldhouse17,116
| 39–41
|- bgcolor="#ffcccc"
| 81
| April 13
| Chicago
| 
| Richard Hamilton (25)
| Antonio McDyess (10)
| Rodney Stuckey (9)
| The Palace of Auburn Hills22,076
| 39–42
|-bgcolor="#ffcccc"
| 82
| April 15
| @ Miami
| 
| Kwame Brown (17)
| Kwame Brown (13)
| Rodney Stuckey (5)
| American Airlines Arena19,600
| 39–43

Playoffs

Game log

|- bgcolor="#ffcccc"
| 1
| April 18
| @ Cleveland
| 
| Rodney Stuckey (20)
| Brown, Wallace (9)
| Hamilton, Stuckey (4)
| Quicken Loans Arena20,562
| 0–1
|- bgcolor="#ffcccc"
| 2
| April 21
| @ Cleveland
| 
| Richard Hamilton (17)
| Antonio McDyess (11)
| Rodney Stuckey (6)
| Quicken Loans Arena20,562
| 0–2
|- bgcolor="#ffcccc"
| 3
| April 24
| Cleveland
| 
| Richard Hamilton (15)
| McDyess, Hamilton (8)
| Richard Hamilton (6)
| The Palace of Auburn Hills22,076
| 0–3
|- bgcolor="#ffcccc"
| 4
| April 26
| Cleveland
| 
| Antonio McDyess (26)
| Antonio McDyess (10)
| Richard Hamilton (7)
| The Palace of Auburn Hills22,076
| 0–4

Trades

Free agents

Additions

Subtractions

References

External links
2008–09 Detroit Pistons telecast schedule

Detroit Pistons seasons
Detroit
2008 in sports in Michigan
2009 in sports in Michigan